This is a partial list of Serbian sportspeople. For the full plain list of Serbian sportspeople on Wikipedia, see :Category:Serbian sportspeople.

Alpine skiing

 Jelena Lolović - Universiade Champion
 Nevena Ignjatović - Universiade Champion
 Marko Đorđević
 Marija Trmčić
 Strahinja Stanišić
 Želimir Vuković

Athletics

 Franjo Mihalić - Olympic  medalist
 Ivan Gubijan - Olympic  medalist
 Ivana Španović - Olympic  medalist
 Vera Nikolić - 2 times European Champion, former world record holder in 800m
 Emir Bekrić
 Dragutin Topić
 Dragan Perić 
 Snežana Pajkić 
 Miloš Srejović 
 Nenad Stekić 
 Olivera Jevtić
 Olga Gere
 Biljana Petrović
 Asmir Kolašinac
 Slobodan Branković
 Dragan Zdravković
 Vladimir Milić
 Mihail Dudaš
 Jovan Lazarević
 Biljana Topić
 Amela Terzić
 Tatjana Jelača

Auto racing

 Bill Vukovich
 Bill Vukovich II
 Billy Vukovich III
 Pete Romcevich
 Dušan Borković
 Miloš Pavlović

Basketball

Players

Male

 Radivoj Korać - Olympic  medalist
 Dražen Dalipagić - Olympic ,   and  medalist
 Dragan Kićanović - Olympic  and  medalist
 Zoran Slavnić - Olympic  and  medalist
 Ratko Radovanović - Olympic  and  medalist
 Vlade Divac - 2 x Olympic  medalist
 Žarko Paspalj - 2 x Olympic  medalist
 Dragutin Čermak - Olympic  medalist
 Vladimir Cvetković - Olympic  medalist
 Zoran Marojević - Olympic  medalist
 Trajko Rajković - Olympic  medalist
 Dragoslav Ražnatović - Olympic  medalist
 Željko Obradović - Olympic  medalist
 Dejan Bodiroga - Olympic  medalist
 Aleksandar Đorđević - Olympic  medalist
 Dejan Tomašević - Olympic  medalist
 Miroslav Berić - Olympic  medalist
 Željko Rebrača - Olympic  medalist
 Predrag Danilović - Olympic  medalist
 Saša Obradović - Olympic  medalist
 Zoran Savić - Olympic  medalist
 Nikola Lončar - Olympic  medalist
 Milenko Topić - Olympic  medalist
 Nebojša Zorkić - Olympic  medalist
 Borislav Stanković
 Dragan Kapičić
 Ljubodrag Simonović
 Zoran Radović
 Radisav Ćurčić - Serbian-Israeli basketball player, 1999 Israeli Basketball Premier League MVP
 Zoran Sretenović
 Dragan Lukovski
 Peja Stojaković
 Vladimir Radmanović
 Dejan Koturović
 Sasha Pavlović
 Dragan Tarlać
 Marko Jarić
 Miloš Vujanić
 Milan Gurović
 Igor Rakočević
 Darko Miličić
 Nenad Krstić
 Miloš Teodosić
 Duško Savanović
 Novica Veličković
 Nemanja Bjelica
 Nikola Pekovic
 Bogdan Bogdanovic
 Nikola Jokić - Olympic  medalist, 2021 NBA Most Valuable Player Award

Female

 Anđelija Arbutina - Olympic  medalist
 Slađana Golić - Olympic  medalist
 Bojana Milošević - Olympic  medalist
 Eleonora Wild - Olympic  medalist
 Vera Đurašković - Olympic  medalist
 Jelica Komnenović - Olympic  medalist
 Vukica Mitić - Olympic  medalist
 Sofija Pekić - Olympic  medalist
 Marija Tonković - Olympic  medalist
 Zorica Đurković - Olympic  medalist
 Vesna Despotović - Olympic  medalist
 Biljana Majstorović - Olympic  medalist
 Jasmina Perazić - Olympic  medalist
 Gordana Grubin - former WNBA player
 Sonja Petrović - former WNBA player
 Miljana Bojović
 Ivana Matović
 Milica Dabović
 Ivanka Matić
 Jelena Milovanović
 Ana Dabović
 Tamara Radočaj

Coaches

 Dušan Ivković
 Željko Obradović
 Ranko Žeravica
 Aleksandar Nikolić
 Svetislav Pešić
 Božidar Maljković
 Milan Opačić
 Igor Kokoškov
 Rajko Toroman

Referees
 Obrad Belošević

Biathlon

 Milanko Petrović 
 Emir Hrkalović

Bobsleigh

 Vuk Rađenović 
 Pavle Jovanovic 
 Damjan Zlatnar 
 Slobodan Matijević 
 Miloš Savić 
 Igor Šarčević

Boxing

 Slobodan Kačar - Olympic  medalist
 Tadija Kačar - Olympic  medalist
 Mirko Puzović - Olympic  medalist
 Zvonimir Vujin - 2 x Olympic  medalist
 Svetomir Belić
 Sreten Mirković
 Ljubiša Simić
 Nenad Borovčanin

Canoeing

 Mirko Nišović - Olympic  and  medalist
 Milan Janić - Olympic  medalist
 Ognjen Filipović
 Dragan Zorić
 Milan Đenadić
 Bora Sibinkić
 Marko Novaković
 Dejan Pajić
 Dusko Stanojević
 Antonija Nađ
 Antonija Panda
 Marta Tibor
 Renata Kubik
 Miljana Knežević

Curling
 Đorđe Nešković

Cycling

 Veselin Petrović
 Ivan Stević
 Nebojša Jovanović
 Gabor Kasa
 Jovana Crnogorac

Fencing

 Vera Jeftimijades
 Tamara Savić-Šotra

Figure skating
 Trifun Živanović

Football

Players

Male

 Alex Smith
 Aleksandar Tirnanić
 Blagoje Marjanović
 Milovan Jakšić
 Rajko Mitić - 2 x Olympic  medalist
 Branko Stanković - 2 x Olympic  medalist
 Kosta Tomašević - 2 x Olympic  medalist
 Aleksandar Atanacković - Olympic  medalist
 Prvoslav Mihajlović - Olympic  medalist
 Ljubomir Lovrić - Olympic  medalist
 Bela Palfi - Olympic  medalist
 Aleksandar Petrović - Olympic  medalist
 Vladimir Beara - Olympic  medalist
 Tihomir Ognjanov - Olympic  medalist
 Vujadin Boškov - Olympic  medalist
 Ratko Čolić - Olympic  medalist
 Zdravko Rajkov - Olympic  medalist
 Miloš Milutinović - 1955–56 UEFA Champions League Top Scorer
 Ljubiša Spajić - Olympic  medalist
 Dobrosav Krstić - Olympic  medalist
 Sava Antić - Olympic  medalist
 Petar Radenković - Olympic  medalist
 Vladica Popović - Olympic  medalist
 Dragoslav Šekularac - Olympic  medalist
 Todor Veselinović - Olympic  medalist
 Blagoje Vidinić - Olympic  and  medalist
 Milutin Šoškić - Olympic  medalist
 Vladimir Durković - Olympic  medalist
 Žarko Nikolić - Olympic  medalist
 Bora Kostić - Olympic  medalist
 Novak Roganović - Olympic  medalist
 Velimir Sombolac - Olympic  medalist
 Silvester Takač - Olympic  medalist, 1971–72 UEFA Champions League Top Scorer
 Dušan Maravić - Olympic  medalist
 Milan Galić - Olympic  medalist
 Jovan Miladinović
 Vladica Kovačević - 1963–64 UEFA Champions League Top Scorer
 Dragan Džajić - 1968. Ballon d'Or 3rd place
 Ilija Pantelić
 Milan Damjanović
 Borivoje Đorđević
 Blagoje Paunović
 Ilija Petković
 Rajko Aleksić
 Miroslav Pavlović
 Dušan Savić
 Jovan Aćimović
 Dobrivoje Trivić
 Ljubomir Mihajlović
 Velibor Vasović
 Dušan Bajević
 Vladimir Petrović
 Dragan Mance
 Borislav Cvetković - Olympic  medalist, 1986–87 UEFA Champions League Top Scorer
 Jovica Nikolić - Olympic  medalist
 Mitar Mrkela - Olympic  medalist
 Dragan Stojković - Olympic  medalist
 Stevan Stojanović
 Milinko Pantić - 1996–97 UEFA Champions League Top Scorer
 Vladimir Jugović
 Siniša Mihajlović
 Zoran Mirković
 Slaviša Jokanović
 Savo Milošević
 Darko Kovačević
 Dejan Stanković
 Dejan Petković
 Mateja Kežman
 Ivica Dragutinović
 Marko Pantelić
 Nikola Žigić
 Nemanja Vidić
 Branislav Ivanović
 Aleksandar Kolarov
 Miloš Krasić
 Zdravko Kuzmanović
 Neven Subotić
 Nemanja Matić
 Dušan Tadić

Female

Jelena Čanković
Jovana Damnjanović
Marija Radojičić
Susanne Nilsson
Danka Podovac
Vesna Smiljković

Coaches

 Ljupko Petrović - UEFA European Cup/Champions League winning manager
 Bora Milutinović
 Miljan Miljanić
 Vujadin Boškov
 Radomir Antić
 Milovan Rajevac
 Slobodan Santrač
 Branko Stanković
 Dragoslav Stepanović
 Ivan Jovanović
 Miroslav Đukić

Golf
Zoran Zorkic

Gymnastics

 Tereza Kočiš
 Mirjana Bilić
 Milena Reljin
 Danijela Simić

Handball

Male

 Momir Rnić - Olympic  and  medalist
 Slobodan Kuzmanovski - Olympic  and  medalist
 Zoran Živković - Olympic  medalist
 Đorđe Lavrnić - Olympic  medalist
 Slobodan Mišković - Olympic  medalist
 Branislav Pokrajac - Olympic  medalist
 Nebojša Popović - Olympic  medalist
 Milan Lazarević - Olympic  medalist
 Petar Fajfrić - Olympic  medalist
 Milorad Karalić - Olympic  medalist
 Zlatan Arnautović - Olympic  medalist
 Jovica Elezović - Olympic  medalist
 Mile Isaković - Olympic  medalist
 Milan Kalina - Olympic  medalist
 Dragan Mladenović - Olympic  medalist
 Zdravko Rađenović - Olympic  medalist
 Veselin Vuković - Olympic  medalist
 Jožef Holpert - Olympic  medalist
 Zlatko Portner - Olympic  medalist
 Dragan Škrbić
 Nedeljko Jovanović
 Arpad Šterbik
 Ratko Nikolić
 Nenad Maksić
 Vladan Matić
 Mladen Bojinović
 Momir Ilić
 Darko Stanić
 Ivan Nikčević
 Rajko Prodanović
 Marko Vujin
 Petar Nenadić
 Nenad Vučković
 Alem Toskić
 Rastko Stojković

Female

 Svetlana Dašić-Kitić - Olympic  and  medalist, The best female handball player ever by the IHF, World Player of the Year 1988
 Svetlana Anastasovska - Olympic  and  medalist
 Mirjana Đurica - Olympic  and  medalist
 Slavica Đukić - Olympic  medalist
 Dragica Đurić - Olympic  medalist
 Emilija Erčić - Olympic  medalist
 Ljubinka Janković - Olympic  medalist
 Zorica Vojinović - Olympic  medalist
 Radmila Savić - Olympic  medalist
 Vesna Radović - Olympic  medalist
 Vesna Milošević - Olympic  medalist
 Radmila Drljača - Olympic  medalist
 Slavica Jeremić - Olympic  medalist
 Tatjana Medved
 Tanja Milanović
 Andrea Lekić
 Sanja Damnjanović
 Svetlana Ognjenović
 Katarina Tomašević
 Dragana Cvijić

Ice hockey

 Alex Andjelic
 Ivan Boldirev

Judo

 Radomir Kovačević - Olympic  medalist
 Slavko Obadov - Olympic  medalist
 Mara Kovačević
 Miloš Mijalković

Karate
 Snežana Pantić

Kickboxing
 Nenad Pagonis

Rowing

 Milorad Stanulov - Olympic  and  medalist
 Zoran Pančić - Olympic  and  medalist
 Nikola Stojić
 Jovan Popović
 Iva Obradović
 Nenad Babović
 Goran Jagar
 Marko Marjanović
 Goran Nedeljković
 Miloš Tomić
 Đorđe Višacki
 Igor Martinović

Shooting sport

 Jasna Šekarić - - 1 x Olympic , 3 x  and 1 x  medalist
 Aleksandra Ivošev - Olympic  and  medalist
 Goran Maksimović - Olympic  medalist
 Ivana Maksimović - Olympic  medalist
 Andrija Zlatić - Olympic  medalist
 Stevan Pletikosić - Olympic  medalist
 Aranka Binder - Olympic  medalist
 Zorana Arunović - World Champion
 Nemanja Mirosavljev - World championship bronze medalist
 Bobana Veličković - 2 times European Champion
 Andrea Arsović - European Champion, Mediterranean Champion
 Damir Mikec

Swimming

 Milorad Čavić - Olympic  medalist
 Nađa Higl
 Velimir Stjepanović
 Ivan Lenđer
 Čaba Silađi
 Nenad Miloš
 Predrag Miloš
 Miroslava Najdanovski
 Vladan Marković
Kristijan Radenkovic

Table tennis

 Ilija Lupulesku - Olympic  medalist
 Gordana Perkučin - Olympic  medalist
 Jasna Fazlić - Olympic  medalist
 Zoran Kalinić
 Aleksandar Karakašević
 Silvija Erdelji
 Slobodan Grujić

Taekwondo

 Milica Mandić - Olympic  medalist
 Vanja Babić

Tennis

Players

 Novak Djokovic - World #1 player, 21 x Grand Slam winner, Olympic  medalist
 Monica Seles - Former World #1 player, 9 x Grand Slam winner, Olympic  medalist
 Ana Ivanovic - former World #1 player, Grand Slam winner
 Jelena Janković - former World #1 player, Wimbledon mixed doubles winner
 Nenad Zimonjić - former World #1 doubles player, 3 x Grand Slam winner in doubles, 4 x in mixed doubles
 Slobodan Živojinović - former World #1 doubles player, US open doubles winner
 Momčilo Tapavica - Olympic  medalist, 1st ethnic Serb Olympic medalist
 Jelena Dokic
 Janko Tipsarević
 Viktor Troicki
 Bojana Jovanovski
 Miomir Kecmanović
 Olga Danilović

Coaches
 Jelena Genčić

Triathlon
 Ognjen Stojanović

Volleyball

Players

Male

 Vladimir Grbić - Olympic  and  medalist
 Nikola Grbić - Olympic  and  medalist
 Goran Vujević - Olympic  and  medalist
 Andrija Gerić - Olympic  and  medalist
 Vladimir Batez - Olympic  and  medalist
 Slobodan Kovač - Olympic  and  medalist
 Đula Mešter - Olympic  and  medalist
 Ivan Miljković - Olympic  medalist
 Slobodan Boškan - Olympic  medalist
 Vasa Mijić - Olympic  medalist
 Veljko Petković - Olympic  medalist
 Rajko Jokanović - Olympic  medalist
 Dejan Brđović - Olympic  medalist
 Đorđe Đurić - Olympic  medalist
 Žarko Petrović - Olympic  medalist
 Željko Tanasković - Olympic  medalist
 Goran Marić
 Vlado Petković
 Bojan Janić
 Nikola Kovačević
 Miloš Nikić
 Marko Podraščanin
 Dragan Stanković
 Saša Starović
 Nikola Rosić
 Mihajlo Mitić
 Aleksandar Atanasijević
 Uroš Kovačević

Female

 Jovana Brakočević
 Jelena Nikolić
 Maja Ognjenović
 Anja Spasojević
 Brižitka Molnar
 Nataša Krsmanović
 Suzana Ćebić
 Milena Rašić
 Sanja Malagurski
 Vesna Čitaković
 Stefana Veljković
 Ana Antonijević
 Ivana Đerisilo
 Tijana Malešević

Coaches
 Zoran Gajić
 Ljubomir Travica

Water Polo

Players

 Igor Milanović - 2x Olympic  medalist
 Dragan Andrić - 2x Olympic  medalist
 Mirko Sandić - Olympic  and  medalist
 Uroš Marović - Olympic  medalist
 Aleksandar Šoštar - Olympic  medalist
 Goran Rađenović - Olympic  medalist
 Zoran Petrović - Olympic  medalist
 Aleksandar Šapić - Olympic  and 2 x  medalist
 Vladimir Vujasinović - Olympic  and 2 x  medalist
 Dejan Savić - Olympic  and 2 x  medalist
 Aleksandar Ćirić- Olympic  and 2 x  medalist
 Vanja Udovičić - Olympic  and 2 x  medalist
 Danilo Ikodinović - Olympic  and  medalist
 Denis Šefik - Olympic  and  medalist
 Viktor Jelenić - Olympic  and  medalist
 Nikola Kuljača - Olympic  and  medalist
 Slobodan Nikić - Olympic  and  medalist
 Petar Trbojević - Olympic  and  medalist
 Filip Filipović - 2x Olympic  medalist
 Andrija Prlainović  - 2x Olympic  medalist
 Slobodan Soro - 2x Olympic  medalist
 Živko Gocić - 2x Olympic  medalist
 Duško Pijetlović - 2x Olympic  medalist
 Nikola Rađen - 2x Olympic  medalist
 Milan Aleksić - Olympic  medalist
 Stefan Mitrović - Olympic  medalist
 Jugoslav Vasović - Olympic  medalist
 Predrag Zimonjić - Olympic  medalist
 Gojko Pijetlović - Olympic  medalist
 Aleksa Šaponjić - Olympic  medalist
 Dušan Mandić - Olympic  medalist
 Branko Peković - Olympic  medalist
 Marko Avramović
 Dušan Popović
 Miloš Ćuk
 Dragan Jovanović
 Branislav Mitrović

Coaches
 Dejan Udovičić
 Nenad Manojlović

Wrestling

 Branislav Simić - Olympic  and  medalist
 Momir Petković - Olympic  medalist
 Branislav Martinović - Olympic  and  medalist
 Ivan Frgić - Olympic  medalist
 Refik Memišević - Olympic  medalist
 Stevan Horvat - Olympic  medalist
 Jožef Tertei - Olympic  medalist
 Borivoje Vukov
 Kristijan Fris
 Davor Štefanek
 Aleksandar Maksimović
 Radomir Petković

Paralympic athletes
 Tanja Dragić - Paralympic  medalist in athletics
 Željko Dimitrijević - Paralympic  medalist in athletics
 Draženko Mitrović - Double paralympic  medalist in athletics
 Miloš Grlica - Paralympic  medalist in athletics
 Zlatko Kesler - 1x , 2x  and 2x  paralympic medalist in table tennis
 Borislava Perić - Double paralympic  medalist in table tennis

Foreign athletes of Serbian origin

 Pete Maravich - basketball, Naismith Memorial Basketball Hall of Fame
 Dražen Petrović - basketball, Naismith Memorial Basketball Hall of Fame
 Natasa Dusev-Janics - canoeing, 3 x Olympic , 2 x , 1 x  medalist
 Lavinia Miloșovici - gymnastics, 2 x Olympic , 1 x , 3 x  medalist
 Nikola Karabatić - handball, 2 x Olympic  medalist
 Daniel Nestor - tennis, Olympic  medalist
 Paola Vukojicic - field hockey, Olympic 1 x , 2 x  medalist
 Danijela Rundqvist - ice hockey, Olympic  and  medalist
 Adrien Plavsic - ice hockey, Olympic  medalist
 Sara Isaković - swimming, Olympic  medalist
 Bojana Radulović - handball, Olympic  medalist
 Bojana Popović - handball, Olympic  medalist
 Katarina Bulatović - handball, Olympic  medalist
 Ana Đokić - handball, Olympic  medalist
 Ljubomir Vranjes - handball, Olympic  medalist
 Dalibor Doder - handball, Olympic  medalist
 Dan Majerle - basketball, Olympic  medalist
 Dragan Travica - volleyball, Olympic  medalist
 James Trifunov - wrestling, Olympic  medalist
 Alex Smith - American football
 Marija Šestak - athletics
 Christina Vukicevic - athletics
 Jeff Samardzija - baseball
 Brian Bogusevic - baseball
 Goran Dragić - basketball
 Sasha Vujačić - basketball
 Aleks Marić - basketball
 Gregg Popovich - basketball
 Press Maravich - basketball
 Tanja Kostic - basketball
 Milan Lucic - ice hockey
 Peter Zezel - ice hockey
 Branko Radivojevič - ice hockey
 Sasha Lakovic - ice hockey
 Dan Kesa - ice hockey
 Stan Smrke - ice hockey
 Mick Vukota - ice hockey
 Milan Marcetta - ice hockey
 Alex Petrovic - ice hockey
 Peter Popovic - ice hockey
 Milos Raonic - tennis
 Andrea Petkovic - tennis
 Kristina Mladenovic - tennis
 Igor Sijsling - tennis
 Frank Dancevic - tennis
 Rhonda Rajsich - racquetball
 Miloš Milošević - swimming
 Dejan Stankovic - beach soccer
 Miodrag Belodedici - football
 Steve Ogrizovic - football
 Zvjezdan Misimović - football
 Daniel Majstorović - football
 Bojan - football
 Marko Marin - football
 Marko Arnautović - football
 Milenko Ačimovič - football
 Milivoje Novaković - football
 Alex Smith - American football

See also

 List of Serbs
 Sport in Serbia

Serbia
Sports